Eugène Marioton (7 April 1857, Paris - 1933) was a French sculptor and medalist. He was a brother of Claudius Marioton and Jean Alfred Marioton (both also artists) and a pupil of Auguste Dumont, Gabriel-Jules Thomas and Jean-Marie Bonnassieux.

References

External links

 

French medallists
19th-century French sculptors
French male sculptors
20th-century French sculptors
1857 births
1933 deaths
19th-century French male artists